Forbidden Valley is a valley to the south of Citadel Peak in the Hays Mountains of Antarctica. The valley drains east-northeast from Mount Crockett to Scott Glacier and is partly covered by glacier and moraine. It was visited in December 1987 by a United States Antarctic Research Program – Arizona State University geological party led by Edmund Stump. The mouth of the valley is blocked by a moraine which denies easy access, hence the name.

References 

Valleys of the Ross Dependency
Amundsen Coast